Andrew Patrick Painter  (born April 10, 2003) is an American professional baseball pitcher in the Philadelphia Phillies organization.

Amateur career
Painter attended Calvary Christian Academy in Fort Lauderdale, Florida. He committed to the University of Florida during his freshman year in 2018. The summer after his freshman year, he played for the USA Baseball 15U National Team in Panama where he earned a Gold Medal and was named to the All-World team. As a sophomore in 2019, he went 7-2 with a 1.43 ERA over  innings, leading Calvary Christian to the 4A state championship game. That summer, he was named to the Under Armour All-America Baseball Game at Wrigley Field, being one of two juniors selected. In 2020, his junior year, he gave up one run and struck out 33 batters over 15 innings before the season was cancelled due to the COVID-19 pandemic. Painter finished his senior season in 2021 with a 6-1 record and a 0.38 ERA while striking out 93 batters over 47 innings. He was named the 2021 Florida Gatorade Player of the Year.

Professional career
The Philadelphia Phillies selected Painter in the first round, with the 13th overall selection, of the 2021 Major League Baseball draft. He signed with the Phillies for a bonus of $3.9 million. He made his professional debut with the Rookie-level Florida Complex League Phillies with whom he threw six scoreless innings with 12 strikeouts for the season.

Painter opened the 2022 season with the Clearwater Threshers of the Single-A Florida State League. After nine starts in which he went 1-1 with a 1.40 ERA, 69 strikeouts, and 16 walks over  innings, he was promoted to the Jersey Shore BlueClaws of the High-A South Atlantic League in early June. On August 14, he was promoted to the Reading Fightin Phils of the Double-A Eastern League after starting eight games and posting a 0.98 ERA with 49 strikeouts over  innings with the BlueClaws. Over five starts with Reading, he went 2-1 with a 2.54 ERA and 37 strikeouts over  innings. He finished the 2022 season with a combined 6-2 record, 1.56 ERA, and 155 strikeouts over  innings between the three teams, with a WHIP of 0.887, and the Phillies named him their Minor League Player of the Year.

On March 10, 2023, Painter was shut down for four weeks after being diagnosed with a proximal ulnar collateral ligament sprain in his right elbow.

References

External links

2003 births
Living people
Baseball players from Florida
Baseball pitchers
United States national baseball team players
Florida Complex League Phillies players
Clearwater Threshers players
Jersey Shore BlueClaws players